Legnano Knights, for sponsorship reasons named FCL Contract Legnano, is an Italian professional basketball club based in Legnano. It plays in the second division Serie A2 as of the 2017-18 season.

Team main sponsors
1966–1987: none
1987–1990: Entremont
1990–2004: Merlett Tecnoplastic
2004–2005: none
2005–2009: Forgiatura Marcora
2009–2013: Royal
2013–2017: Europromotion 
2017–present: FCL Contract

Notable players
 Andrea Bianchi
 Roberto Cazzaniga
 Fabio Di Bella
 John Merchant
 Ousman Krubally
 Nik Raivio

External links
Official website
Eurobasket.com profile

1966 establishments in Italy
Basketball teams established in 1966
Basketball teams in Lombardy
Sport in Lombardy